This is a list of songs that are featured in Andamiro's Pump It Up video game series.

Pump It Up features the in-house musician BanYa, who were responsible for original songs in the series under dance pop, rock, heavy metal, jazz, folk, progressive and house genre, including the remixes of classical pieces such as Canon-D, Turkey March and Moonlight. In Fiesta, MAX, Doin and SHK (originally from O2Jam) joined as new in-house musicians. Since 1st Dance Floor, there are the large number of licensed K-pop songs. Starting with Pump It Up Premiere and onward, the international songs are included mostly from North America, Latin America, Mexico, Brazil, China, etc. In almost all versions, BanYa were also responsible for nonstop remixes that mixes numerous K-pop and world music songs, especially original songs (examples are J Knows that Old Bong, World Remix, Turkey Virus, K-pop Dance, Chicago Club Mix, etc.), but they are available in Remix Station (Special Zone in NX) or WorldMax in NX2 and NXA (Quest World in Fiesta). Starting Exceed 2, full songs are added only in separate stations.

Songlist

1st Dance Floor

2nd Dance Floor

3rd Dance Floor O.B.G

3rd Dance Floor S.E (Season Evolution)

Perfect Collection

Extra

Premiere

Rebirth

Premiere 3

PREX 3

Exceed

Exceed 2

Zero

NX (New Xenesis)

NX2 (Next Xenesis)

NXA (NX Absolute)

Fiesta 2010

Fiesta EX 2011

Fiesta 2 2013

Prime 2015

Prime 2 2017

XX (20th Anniversary Edition)

M (Mobile Edition)

PRO

PRO 2

Infinity

In-house artists

Main Pump It Up series 

 (*) All BanYa PIU Original regular songs, including Yahpp and msgoon, are counted to 122.

PRO series

See also 
 Pump It Up (video game series)
 BanYa

Notes

References

External links 
 
 Pump It Up XX Full Song List (v2.08.0)

Video games developed in South Korea
Pump It Up songs, List of